The Beast of Budapest is a 1958 American film about the Hungarian Revolution of 1956.

Cast
 Gerald Milton as Col. Otto Zagon
Greta Thyssen as Christi
John Hoyt as Prof. Ernst Tolnai
Violet Rensing as Marissa Foldessy
Joseph Turkel as Martin
John Mylong as Gen. Foldessy
Michael Mills as Charles Tolnai
Booth Colman as Lieutenant Stefko
Svea Grunfeld as Teresa
John Banner as Dr. Kovach
Kurt Katch as Geza
Ansis Tipans as AVH guard
 Robert Blake as Karolyi

Reception
The Los Angeles Times said it was "poorly made".

References

External links
Beast of Budapest at TCMDB
The Beast of Budapest at IMDb
Beast of Budapest at BFI
Review at Shock Theatre

1958 films
1958 drama films
American drama films
Films set in Budapest
Allied Artists films
Films directed by Harmon Jones
1950s English-language films
1950s American films